Harman Connected Services, often abbreviated to HCS, is an American subsidiary of Samsung Electronics through Harman International Industries. The Connected Services Division supplies software services to the mobile communications industry. HCS is a technologies company leader in Cloud, Mobile, Analytics Capabilities, Design, and Software Services. Harman has a workforce of approximately 30,000 people across the Americas, Europe, and Asia.

On January 22, 2015, Harman acquired Symphony Teleca from the Symphony Technology Group. The deal was valued at US$780 million. Symphony Telca was subsequently integrated and rebranded as Harman Connected Services and, in March 2017, Harman became a wholly owned subsidiary of Samsung Electronics.

History

Early history
Teleca was founded in 1992 by a team of software engineers, based in Manchester. Over the coming years, Teleca's telecom software was utilized by Motorola, Racal, Digital, GEC, Hewlett-Packard, Psion, and Siemens. The presence in the market led to a number of major mobile device partnerships, which led them to expand their offering into the mobile phone market. These vendors included Nokia, Motorola and SonyEricsson.

In early 2000, it was acquired by Sigma AB, a leading Swedish engineering services business, and became its UK subsidiary. Following the takeover, Teleca expanded their workforce from 2,500 across Europe into a number of countries including Łodz, Poland and Seoul, South Korea.

Teleca then acquired Telma Soft in 2006, a Russian-based software company. Over the next two years, Teleca opened a number of different locations up in both India and China.

Symphony Technology Group announced in 2008 that they had acquired Teleca and delisted it from the Stockholm stock exchange. Later that year, Telma Soft was then rebranded to become the Russian Teleca operation.

In 2013, the company had 9000+ employees in 35 countries with the largest number of employees in India spread across many locations, including Bangalore, Pune, Gurgaon and Chennai.

Symphony ownership
Symphony services was founded in 2002 with initial financial support from Romesh T. Wadhwani, Chairman, CEO and founder of Symphony Technology Group. In 2003, Symphony raised growth capital from TH Lee Putnam Ventures. In 2004, Symphony Services purchased Stonehouse Technologies for $6.7 million.

Following the purchase of Teleca, it became Symphony Teleca and part of the Symphony Services division. The new services division focused on software product engineering outsourcing services and was headquartered in Palo Alto, California, with major global operations centers in the U.S., India and China. The company was assessed as CMMI level 3.

In 2010, Symphony acquired Proteans Software Solutions, an Indian company engaged in providing software engineering services to the small and medium ISV space; followed by CoreObjects Software Inc, a Los Angeles-based company specializes in embedded product development for technology companies.

In 2011, Symphony Services acquired JPC Software, an Argentina entity that offers IT solutions, consulting and support services based in Buenos Aires.

In 2012, Symphony Services Corporation merged with Teleca, creating Symphony Teleca Corporation with a focus to help clients manage the global convergence of software, the cloud, and mobility. Symphony Teleca announced on 10 April 2014 that they would be acquiring Aditi Technologies for an undisclosed amount. Following the acquisition, Sanjay Dhawan took over as CEO and Pradeep Rathinam was appointed as Aditi's president. Aditi subsequently became an independent business unit of Symphony Teleca.

Harman Connected Services
In 2015, it was announced that Harman International Industries were interested in acquiring Symphony Teleca. Harman and Symphony Technology Group agreed on a deal worth US$780 million. Teleca was rebranded Harman Connected Services, with a focus on producing software for all Harman-related products.

As well as Symphony Teleca, Harman also acquired Red Bend Software. The total price for the acquisition was $200 million, with $170 million in shares and $30 million in cash once certain milestones were reached. The Red Bend software remote revision by cellular operators of both software and physical components installed in cellular devices and its software is used on more than 2 billion mobile phones globally. TowerSec was another company acquired by HARMAN in 2016. The Israel-based cyber security company focused on security for the automotive industry.

Collectively, the acquired companies were merged to form Harman Connected Services. Its parent company was acquired in 2016 for US$8 billion by Samsung Electronics.

Global locations

Certifications
 ISO 9001:2008

References

Further reading
 The Hindu Business Line : Symphony Service, Aldata in pact

External links 
 Symphony SMS - Telecom Expense Management - TEMS.
 EFYTimes.com, May 27, 2010 - Inauguration of Teleca India's new premises
 February 15, 2010 - Teleca's collaboration with Imagination Technologies to bring optimized technology for Adobe Flash and Flash Lite
 February 10, 2010 - Teleca's partner SVOX and what they exhibited in Teleca's stand at Mobile World Congress
 TMCnet.com, February 10, 2010 - Teleca's partnership agreement with Antix
 Dr. Dobb's, December 19, 2009 - Article by Teleca's Andrew Till about avoiding open source pitfalls
 February 13, 2009 - Article about Teleca's partnership with TAT in Swedish daily
 SOA World Magazine, February 10, 2009 - Article about Teleca's work to enable Android for CDMA phone market 

Outsourcing companies
Software companies based in California
Harman International
Software companies of the United States
2001 establishments in California